Johnson City STOLport  is a privately owned, public use STOLport in Washington County, Tennessee, United States. It is located three nautical miles (6 km) northeast of the central business district of Johnson City, Tennessee. This facility has a runway designed for use by STOL (short take-off and landing) aircraft.

Facilities and aircraft 
Johnson City STOLport covers an area of 45 acres (18 ha) at an elevation of 1,550 feet (472 m) above mean sea level. It has one runway designated 4/22 with an asphalt surface measuring 3,000 by 50 feet (914 x 15 m).

For the 12-month period ending June 11, 1998, the airport had 7,550 general aviation aircraft operations, an average of 21 per day. There were 20 aircraft based at the airport: 70% single-engine, 20% multi-engine, and 10% glider.

References

External links 
 Aerial image as of March 1997 from USGS The National Map
 Aeronautical chart from SkyVector

Airports in Tennessee
Transportation in Washington County, Tennessee
Buildings and structures in Washington County, Tennessee